French Sudan was a French colonial territory in the Federation of French West Africa from around 1880 until 1959, when it joined the Mali Federation, and then in 1960, when it became the independent state of Mali. The colony was formally called French Sudan from 1890 until 1899 and then again from 1921 until 1958, and had a variety of different names over the course of its existence. The colony was initially established largely as a military project led by French troops, but in the mid-1890s it came under civilian administration.

A number of administrative reorganizations in the early 1900s brought increasing French administration over issues like agriculture, religion, and slavery. Following World War II, the African Democratic Rally (RDA) under Modibo Keïta became the most significant political force pushing for independence.

French Sudan initially retained close connections with France and joined in a short-lived federation with Senegal in 1959, but ties to both countries quickly weakened. In 1960, the French Sudan formally became the Republic of Mali and began to distance itself further from Senegal and France.

Colonial establishment

French Sudan originally formed as a set of military outposts as an extension of the French colony in Senegal. Though the area offered France little economic or strategic gain, the military effectively advocated greater conquest in the region. This was partly due to a fascination with the great empires, such as the Mali Empire and the Songhay Empire that rose to prominence in the area, and partly due to the promotional opportunities that military conquest offered for French military personnel.

French conquest began in 1879, when Joseph Gallieni was dispatched to the area to establish a fort and survey the land for a railroad from Dakar in Senegal to the Niger River. This was followed with the establishment of a number of French forts and political alliances with specific leaders in the region in the early 1880s. The administrative structure of the area was still largely under control of the French Governor of Senegal, and the most significant colonization were simply the military forts and outposts, including the important one established at Kayes in 1881 by Gustave Borgnis-Desbordes.  Though the civilian administration of the French governor of Senegal formally ruled the area, military officers in the region largely bypassed these leaders and answered directly to commanding officers in Paris. Desbordes gradually took over more territory, often using inter-ethnic rivalries and political tension among leaders in the area to appoint French-supportive leaders.

French civilian administrators struggled with the military leaders, and the two forces went through a number of leadership changes over the territory, until Louis Archinard was appointed military governor in 1892. Archinard led military campaigns against Samori Ture, Ahmadu Tall, and other resistant leaders in the region, with varying success. Archinard's campaigns were often executed through direct military control, without civilian oversight. As costs increased, the French administration decided to replace Archinard's control over the area with a civilian governor, Louis Albert Grodet.

Administration and jurisdiction

The region was governed under a number of different names between 1880 and 1960. The area was Upper River from 1880 until 18 August 1890, when it was renamed French Sudan, with its capital at Kayes. On 10 October 1899, French Sudan was divided, with the southern cercles joining coastal colonies, and the rest split into two administrative areas called Middle Niger and Upper Senegal. In 1902, the region again was organized as a unified colony under the name Senegambia and Niger (Sénégambie et Niger). The name changed again in 1904 to Upper Senegal and Niger (Haut Sénégal et Niger). Finally, in 1921, the name changed back to French Sudan (Soudan Français).

Borders and administration of the colony similarly changed a number of times. Originally, and for the initial period, the colony vacillated between military administration and civilian administration from Senegal. In 1893, French Sudan formally came under civilian administration, which lasted until 1899. At that point, a reorganization of the colony split 11 southern provinces to other French colonies like French Guinea, the Ivory Coast and Dahomey.

The area that was not reorganized was governed in two administrations linked to other French colonies. Following this, the territory of the colony was reestablished in 1902. Though the borders shifted slightly, there was little territorial change until 1933. At that point, the colony of the French Upper Volta (Haute-Volta, modern Burkina Faso) dissolved, and the northern territory was added to French Sudan.

In 1947, Upper Volta was reestablished, and the French Sudan borders became those that eventually became the borders of Mali. Kayes was the original capital city from the 1890s until 1908 when the capital moved to Bamako, where it remains.

Agriculture
The colony supported mostly rain-fed agriculture, with limited irrigation for its first 30 years. The only cash crops were nuts gathered close to the railroad between Kayes and Bamako. However, following successful tests of growing Egyptian cotton in West Africa during World War I,  began to campaign for the construction of a large irrigation system along the Niger River. Starting in 1921, significant irrigation projects around Koulikoro and later at Baguinéda-Camp and the Ségou Cercle began to bring water. The French believed this project could rival the major cotton growing centers of Egypt and the United States.

Unlike other agricultural projects in French West Africa, the French Sudan irrigation project initially relied on families voluntarily resettling along lines established by the colonial authority. Unable to attract enough volunteers, the colonial authorities began to try forced resettlement to the cotton project. The Office du Niger was founded in 1926 as the main organization facilitating planned, irrigated agricultural projects. Farmers resisted forced resettlement and petitioned for permanent land rights to the irrigated land (which was usually held as property of the Office du Niger). Despite these efforts, a significant cash crop economy did not develop in the French Sudan.

Religious policy
Like much of the rest of French West Africa, the colony had a number of policies regarding Islam and the Muslim communities. The Arabic language and Islamic law were preferred in the colony by the French in the establishment of colonial government, largely because both were codified, and thus easy to standardize.

Though they maintained a formal neutrality policy in regard to religion, the French colonial administration began to regulate Islamic education in the early 1900s. In addition, fear of a pan-Islamism political rise throughout North Africa and the Sahel led the French to adopt policies that aimed to prevent the spread of Islam beyond where it already existed and to prevent Muslim leaders from governing non-Muslim communities. Indigenous religions and Christianity existed under less formal policies, and French efforts often used these to balance the spread of Islam in the region.

In the 1940s, a religious movement called Allah Koura began in the San Cercle based upon the visions of a single person. Local administrators allowed the Allah Koura movement to spread and practice, seeing it as a potential limiting influence on the spread of Islam farther south. In the late 1950s, Muslim protests and riots throughout the colony further contributed to a growing independence movement.

Slavery policy
Like much of the rest of French West Africa, authorities enforced explicit rules in an attempt to end slavery in the region. In 1903, the government instructed French administrators not to use slave as an administrative category anymore. This was followed in 1905 by a formal French decree that ended slavery throughout French West Africa.

Almost a million slaves in French West Africa responded to this by moving away from their masters and settling elsewhere. The French supported these efforts by creating settlements around the Niger River and digging wells for communities elsewhere so they could farm away from their former masters.

This process affected the southern and western parts of present-day Mali most significantly, but in the northern and eastern parts of the colony large numbers of slaves remained in servitude to their masters. According to rough estimates, throughout the area of present-day Mali, about one-third of former slaves moved away from the slavery relationship, while two-thirds remained with their masters. In the 1920s, most Tuareg households still had slaves who tended to the house and animals.

Though slavery persisted, some aspects of the relationship changed with the French administration. Escaped slaves could find official protection by French authorities in the cities for a limited time. Slaves could sometimes renegotiate the terms of their servitude in the changed political situation. Some were willing to agree to remain in servitude if they received control over their family life and some land to pass to their children. In addition, the French administration actively worked to end slave raiding and the most clear manifestations of the slave trade, greatly reducing those means of acquiring slaves. However, for many decades after the 1905 abolition of slavery, the practice continued in much of French Sudan.

Independence

Following the passage of the Loi Cadre by the French National Assembly in 1956, many of the colonies in French West African began to hold elections to increase the self-determination of their territories. In the first elections held in French Sudan in 1957, the African Democratic Rally (Rassemblement Démocratique Africain, commonly known as the RDA) won the elections in French Sudan, as well as winning majorities in neighboring Ivory Coast, French Guinea, and the Upper Volta. Following the French constitutional referendum of 1958, which received an overwhelming majority in support, the  declared itself a republic with internal autonomy on 24 November 1958. The Sudanese Republic, as the area was now called, was the second colony after Madagascar to join the French Community, which provided it internal autonomy while linking its currency, foreign policy and defense with France.

In early January 1959, there were plans for a federation linking the Sudanese Republic with Senegal, Dahomey, and the Upper Volta in a federation of autonomous states. By April, however, neither Dahomey's nor Upper Volta's legislatures had ratified the federation, and so the Mali Federation was formed with only the Sudanese Republic and Senegal. In 1959, Modibo Keïta's RDA party won all 70 seats in the legislative elections in the Sudanese Republic and joined forces with the dominant party in Senegal, headed by Léopold Sédar Senghor. The federation achieved independence on 20 June 1960 within the French Community; however, divisions between Senghor and Keïta on the governance of the federation resulted in its dissolution on 20 August 1960. The area of French Sudan formally proclaimed itself the Republic of Mali and, with increasing radicalization of Keita, left the French Community in September 1960.

See also

 Sudan (region): the Sudan (or Soudan in French) climate region, of which French Sudan formed the western part.
French colonial empire
List of French possessions and colonies

References

Bibliography
Books and Journal articles

 Bigon, Liora (2015) "Military Settlement Forms in Colonial Dakar and Western Sudan: Hesitative Moments" Journal of Asian and African Studies, doi: 10.1177/0021909614548240
-

Newspapers (organized chronologically)

Further reading
 Joseph Roger de Benoist, Église et pouvoir colonial au Soudan français: les relations entre les administrateurs et les missionnaires catholiques dans la Boucle du Niger, de 1885 à 1945. 539 p. Karthala, 1987 
 Georges Spitz, Le Soudan français, Éditions maritimes et coloniales, 1955, 111 p.

 
Political history of Mali
French West Africa
States and territories established in 1890
Former colonies in Africa
1960 disestablishments in Africa